Robert Valentine (21 December 1877 – 16 January 1926) was an English rugby league and association football player. In association football, his regular position was as a goalkeeper, and he made ten first team appearances for Manchester United (1903–1908). He also played rugby league for Swinton.

Valentine was born in 1877 in Pendleton, Salford, Lancashire, the youngest son of Robert Valentine, who was in the Navy, and Ann Wallwork Valentine. His elder brother was Swinton legend Jim Valentine (1866–1904). Their father died in 1884 when Robert was 6 years old, and he later moved in with his brother in Irlams o' th' Height.

Valentine died at the original Salford Royal Hospital on Chapel Street/Adelphi Street, Salford in 1926 aged 48

References

External links
Photograph 'Team Photo 1906-07' at swintonlionstales.co.uk

1877 births
1926 deaths
Association football goalkeepers
English footballers
English rugby league players
Footballers from Salford
Manchester United F.C. players
Rugby league players from Salford
Swinton Lions players